Ma'mun al-Hudaybi (May 28, 1921 – January 8, 2004) was the sixth General Guide of the Muslim Brotherhood in Egypt. He briefly succeeded Mustafa Mashhur as General Guide in 2002, and headed the Islamist group until his death on January 8, 2004. His successor was Mohammed Mahdi Akef. Ma'mun al-Hudaybi was the son of the second General Guide, Hassan al-Hudaybi.

Early life and education 
He was born in Sohag, in Upper Egypt on May 28, 1921. His family was originally from ‘Arab al-Sawalha in Qalyubiyya, but moved wherever his father's work as a judge for the Justice Ministry took them.
He received a public education before graduating from the King Fouad University College of Law.

Political Beliefs 
Hudaybi is an important figure in Egyptian Islamist politics. In terms of internal political organization, he is reported by historian Fawaz Gerges as believing that "members must show obedience to the senior leadership."

References

1921 births
2004 deaths
Cairo University alumni
Egyptian Muslim Brotherhood leaders
People from Sohag Governorate